The 1976 Wyoming Cowboys football team was an American football team that represented the University of Wyoming as a member of the Western Athletic Conference (WAC) during the 1976 NCAA Division I football season.  In their second and final season under head coach Fred Akers, the Cowboys compiled an 8–4 record (6–1 against conference opponents), tied for the WAC championship, lost to Oklahoma in the Fiesta Bowl, and outscored their opponents by a total of 278 to 250.

They played their home games on campus at War Memorial Stadium in Laramie, Wyoming.

The team's statistical leaders included Don Clayton with 409 passing yards, Robbie Wright with 718 rushing yards, Walter Howard with 305 receiving yards, and Dan Christopulos with 53 points scored.

It was Wyoming's first winning season since 1969 and first bowl appearance since the Sugar Bowl in January 1968. Akers soon departed for the University of Texas and the Cowboys' next winning season was in 1980; the next bowl appearance was in December 1987.

Schedule

References

Wyoming
Wyoming Cowboys football seasons
Western Athletic Conference football champion seasons
Wyoming Cowboys football